The Land Report is an American magazine and website that focuses on private landownership in the United States. It profiles leading landowners and compiles the Land Report 100, an annual ranking of America's largest landowners. The editorial staff also reports on topics such as significant properties, landmark transactions, market news, investing, and conservation, as well as legislation and judicial decisions affecting landowners.

High-profile landowners who have been featured in the magazine include Tom Brokaw, Clint Eastwood, Red Emmerson, Bill Gates, John Jordan, Joe Montana, T. Boone Pickens, Nolan Ryan, and Ted Turner.

The Land Report also profiles well-known landmarks such as Hearst Ranch, Natural Bridge, the Waggoner Ranch, the 6666 Ranch, and Cabin Bluff Sporting Plantation, one of the nation’s oldest hunt clubs.


History 
Founded by Eric O'Keefe and Eddie Lee Rider Jr, The Land Report was first published in April 2007 and bills itself as "The Magazine of the American Landowner." Its premier issue included the inaugural Land Report 100 and was the subject of a feature article in The Wall Street Journal. Since its 2007 launch, O'Keefe has served as editor-in-chief and Rider the publisher.

Land Report 100 
 The Land Report 100 is an annual ranking of America's leading landowners and the magazine's signature study. It is regularly cited by U.S. and international media in articles that cover leading American landowners. The inaugural Land Report 100 was published in April 2007. More recently, the Land Report 100 has been published in the magazine's winter issue.

The 2020 Land Report 100 broke the story of Bill Gates's ownership of 242,000 acres of farmland, an amount that ranked first in the United States among private landowners. Overall, Gates ranked No. 49 on the 2020 Land Report 100.

The 2021 Land Report 100 featured an in-depth interview with Red Emmerson, the founder and chairman emeritus of Sierra Pacific Industries. Thanks to his family's 2.33 million acres of timberland holdings in California, Oregon, and Washington, the Emmersons rank as America's leading private landowners ahead of John Malone's 2.2 million acres, the Reed family's 2.1 million acres, and Ted Turner's 2 million acres.

Deals of the Year 
Each year in its spring issue, The Land Report recognizes a single landmark transaction as the Land Report Deal of the Year. Additional transactions highlighting farmland, ranchland, timberland, and other land types are also featured. Examples of Deals of the Year include Florida’s Bluffs of Saint Teresa, Utah’s Wasatch Peak Ranch, California’s Dangermond Preserve, and Texas’s Waggoner Ranch.

Best Brokerages 
The Land Report annually surveys US land brokerages to ascertain the total value of self-reported domestic land sales through traditional brokerage. The totals exclude commercial, industrial, and residential assets, unless those assets were a component of a more valuable land asset. In 2020, the brokerages that reported the highest level of commissionable sales — in excess of $1 billion — included Cushman & Wakefield Land Advisory Group, Hall and Hall, LandVest, Mossy Oak Properties, United Country Real Estate, and Whitetail Properties.

References

External links
Official site 
Subscription Center
Advertising Information
Wall Street Journal article on The Land Report 100

Magazines established in 2007
Magazines published in Texas
Mass media in Dallas
News magazines published in the United States
Online magazines published in the United States
Quarterly magazines published in the United States